Sorefame (an abbreviation of Sociedades Reunidas de Fabricações Metálicas) was a Portuguese manufacturer of railway rolling stock and industrial equipment, such as dam gates equipment. The company was established in 1943.

In the 1990s the company was split into a rolling stock company Nova Sorefame and a dam equipment company Hidrosorefame; Hidrosorefame was acquired by Alstom, the rolling stock business became part of ABB's rail transport division, later Adtranz, and in 2001 part of Bombardier transportation; it was closed in 2005.

Company history 

Sorefame was founded in 1943, capitalised using state funds, but run as a private business. The company had two main product lines: railway equipment such as rolling stock, and equipment for hydro-electric reservoirs, such as dam gates.

In 1987 Sorefame underwent restructuring with MOMPOR, forming a new company Sociedade de Montagens Metalomecânicas (SMM); in 1990 SMM merged with Sorefame, MAGUE and SEPSA resulting to form Grupo SENETE, in which ABB Group had a 40% share.

In the 1990s the company was split into two entities, one rolling stock company, and a dam equipment company Hidro-sorefame, by 1994 ABB had a 70% share of SENETE, and the following year Hidro-Sorefame became ABB-hidro. SENETE was fully acquired by ABB in 1997, and in 1999 ABB's power business was include in a power generation joint venture with Alstom: ABB ALSTOM POWER. In 2000 Alstom acquired ABB's stake in the joint venture, with the former 'Hidro-sorefame' still as a subentity of the firm.

ABB merged its rail transportation division with that of Daimler-Benz forming Adtranz, subsequently divesting itself of the interest in 1999. Adtranz was eventually sold to Bombardier Transportation — which became owner of the manufacturing facility in Amadora. Under ABB and later Adtranz and Bombardier the rolling stock company became increasing an assembly plant — with the resultant loss of many jobs.

In 2001 during Bombardier's restructuring after the acquisition of Adtranz the plant in Amadora was decided to be one of Bombardier's seven final manufacturing plants in Europe, with it also being used for assembly in the case of undercapacity elsewhere. Limited demand and overcapacity in rolling stock manufacturing capacity across Europe resulted in the closure of the Sorefame railway factory in 2004.

In 2005 part the Amadora plant was expropriated by Refer, with Bombardier being offered approximately €7million for less than half of the site; the site was to be used for training and development of railway related skills and technology, and the expropriation was justified as being in the public interest. In 2008 the land formally became the property of Comboios de Portugal (CP), to be occupied by CP subsidiary EMEF (Empresa de Manutenção de Equipamento Ferroviário) The remainder of the site was sold to glass container manufacturer Sotancro. An investment of €500 million is expected to re-establish a rail vehicle business in Portugal, to be built in Médio Tejo.

Products

Railway rolling stock 

From the 1960s the company specialised in the manufacture of stainless steel carriages, principally for the Portuguese Railways (CP). The stainless steel carriages were built at the company's factory in Amadora under licence from the Budd Company of the US. During the years of the Salazar regime (the Estado Novo), Sorefame supplied the vast majority of Portugal's railway rolling stock (as well as for Portugal's then colonies), but the Carnation Revolution of 1974 and economic liberalisation, especially following Portugal's entry to the European Union in 1986, resulted in far greater international competition. Sorefame also assembled diesel and electric locomotives for CP (such as the Série 1900 in 1981), notably using components designed and supplied by the French company Alstom.

The firm had also fabricated the shells for Boeing Vertol's 2400 series railcars constructed for the Chicago Transit Authority in 1976.

Dam equipment

References

External links 

Rolling stock manufacturers of Portugal
Manufacturing companies established in 1943
Manufacturing companies disestablished in 2005
2005 disestablishments in Portugal
Portuguese companies established in 1943
Defunct manufacturing companies of Portugal